Sylwester Kaliski (19 December 1925 – 16 September 1978) was a Polish engineer, professor and military general. He was a member of the Polish Academy of Sciences (PAN).

Born in Toruń, Kaliski was a specialist in the field of applied physics. He developed the theory of continuous amplification of ultra and hyper-sounds in semiconductive crystals and obtained plasma temperature of tens of millions of kelvins using laser impulse. He died in Warsaw, Poland in car crash. It has been speculated that Kaliski was killed by the Soviet KGB, as he headed the Polish clandestine program of developing thermonuclear devices intended for military use. The program began on orders from the highest levels of Polish communists and was reportedly opposed by the Soviet Union.

Accolades 

 Order of Builders of People's Poland - 1978 (posthumously)

 Order of the Banner of Labour 1st Class - 1968

 Commander's Cross Polonia Restituta - 1973

 Knight's Cross of the Order of Polonia Restituta - 1961

 Gold Cross of Merit - 1957

 People's Republic of Poland 30th Anniversary Medal - 1974

 Gold Medal "Armed Forces in Service of the Fatherland" - 1970

 Silver Medal "Armed Forces in Service to the Fatherland" - 1970

 Bronze Medal "Armed Forces in Service to the Fatherland" - 1970

 Gold Medal "For Meritorious Service to National Defence" - 1974

 Silver Medal "For Meritorious Service to National Defence

 Bronze Medal "For meritorious service to national defence"

 Order of Friendship of Nations (Soviet Union) - 1973

 Order of War Merit with a Great Star (Yugoslavia) - 1967

 Entry in the "Honorary Book of Soldierly Deeds" - 1973

 and others.

References

1925 births
1978 deaths
People from Toruń
People from Pomeranian Voivodeship (1919–1939)
Members of the Central Committee of the Polish United Workers' Party
Government ministers of Poland
Members of the Polish Sejm 1972–1976
Members of the Polish Sejm 1976–1980
Polish People's Army generals
Nuclear engineers
20th-century Polish engineers
20th-century Polish physicists
Gdańsk University of Technology alumni
Members of the Polish Academy of Sciences
Recipients of the Order of the Builders of People's Poland
Recipients of the Order of the Banner of Work
Commanders of the Order of Polonia Restituta
Knights of the Order of Polonia Restituta
Recipients of the Gold Cross of Merit (Poland)
Recipients of the Order of Friendship of Peoples